Harry Richardson Creswick (1902 – 14 October 1988) was a British librarian who was head of the university libraries at both Oxford and Cambridge.

Life
Creswick was born in 1902 and educated at Queen Elizabeth's Grammar School, Barnet before studying at Trinity College, Cambridge.  He joined the staff of the Cambridge University Library in 1926 and worked there until 1938; in the following year, he moved to the University of Oxford as Deputy Librarian of the Bodleian Library.  In 1945, he succeeded Edmund Craster as Bodley's Librarian (the head of the library); he was also a Fellow of Christ Church, Oxford.  He left the Bodleian in 1947 and in 1949 returned to Cambridge as Librarian of the University and a Fellow of Jesus College, Cambridge.  He retired in 1967, and died on 14 October 1988.

References

1902 births
1988 deaths
English librarians
Bodley's Librarians
Alumni of Trinity College, Cambridge
Fellows of Christ Church, Oxford
Fellows of Jesus College, Cambridge
Cambridge University Librarians
People educated at Queen Elizabeth's Grammar School for Boys